Noor Al-Rashidi (born 12 March 1995), is a Saudi Arabian professional footballer who plays as a defender for Saudi Professional League side Al-Wehda.

Career
Al-Rashidi started his career at the youth team of Al-Ansar and represented the club at every level, On 26 December 2019, Al-Rashidi joined Al-Wehda from Al-Ansar.

References

External links
 

1995 births
Living people
Saudi Arabian footballers
Association football defenders
Al-Ansar FC (Medina) players
Al-Wehda Club (Mecca) players
Saudi Second Division players
Saudi First Division League players
Saudi Professional League players